Thomas Gordon McLeod (December 17, 1868December 11, 1932) was an American attorney and the 95th Governor of South Carolina from 1923 to 1927.

Biography
Born in Lynchburg, South Carolina to William J. McLeod, a former captain in the Confederate Army, and Amanda McMillan Rogers McLeod, he attended Lynchburg Academy and graduated from Wofford College and the University of Virginia Law School.

His political career began when he was elected to the South Carolina House of Representatives in 1900 and he became the first state senator from the newly formed Lee County in 1902. In 1906, he was elected the 66th lieutenant governor of South Carolina and re-elected in 1908. In the 1922 gubernatorial election, McLeod won a Democratic primary runoff against former Governor Cole Blease, effectively becoming the 95th governor of South Carolina. Re-elected in 1924, McLeod served as governor until his term expired in 1927.

Upon leaving office he became the president of the Bishopville Telephone Company. He died on December 11, 1932, in Bishopville and is buried in the Bishopville Methodist Churchyard.

References 

1868 births
1932 deaths
University of Virginia School of Law alumni
Democratic Party members of the South Carolina House of Representatives
Democratic Party South Carolina state senators
Democratic Party governors of South Carolina
University of South Carolina trustees
Wofford College alumni
People from Lee County, South Carolina